Speed Wild is a 1925 American silent action film directed by Harry Garson and starring Maurice 'Lefty' Flynn, Ethel Shannon, and Frank Elliott.

Plot
As described in a film magazine review, Jack Ames joins the police force after getting a reputation for racing, and beating, motorcycle riding coppers. His fiancée, Mary Bryant, is wooed by Wendell Martin, the brains of a gang of smugglers. Mary's brother Charles is also an involuntary member of the gang. When Mary is thrown in front of a train in an automobile crash, Jack rescues her. He then saves her brother from the vengeance of the smugglers. When he follows the gang on his motorcycle, his machine is thrown off a high cliff into the ocean. Martin kidnaps Mary and puts her on his ship. Jack follows and, with the aid of the whole police force, rescues her.

Cast

References

Bibliography
 Connelly, Robert B. The Silents: Silent Feature Films, 1910-36, Volume 40, Issue 2. December Press, 1998.
 Munden, Kenneth White. The American Film Institute Catalog of Motion Pictures Produced in the United States, Part 1. University of California Press, 1997.

External links

1925 films
1920s action films
American silent feature films
American action films
American black-and-white films
Films directed by Harry Garson
Film Booking Offices of America films
1920s English-language films
1920s American films